Asit Kumar Modi (born 24 December 1966) is an Indian TV actor, producer, director and founder of Neela Tele Films Private Limited. He is known for producing the serials Taarak Mehta Ka Ooltah Chashmah, SAB Khelo SAB Jeeto!, Wah! Wah! Kya Baat Hai!, Krishnaben Khakhrawala, Pyaar Mein Twist,  Meri Biwi Wonderful, Yeh Duniya Hai Rangeen and Hum Sab Ek Hai.

Modi and his team of Taarak Mehta Ka Ooltah Chashmah were among the first nine citizens of India to be nominated by the Indian Prime Minister Narendra Modi to promote his Clean India Campaign.

Education 
Asit Kumar Modi was born in Pune. Modi completed his schooling from Sardar Vallabhbhai Patel School, Mumbai in 1982. He studied for a bachelor's degree in Commerce from Shri Chinai College of Commerce & Economics Mumbai from 1983 to 1989.

Career 
Modi began his career in theatre as an actor, technician and assistant director. He was a lighting designer for Gujarati professional stage shows and handled the production and creative department of various serials in regional languages. He executed shows on Gujarati television with literature personalities as well.
Modi handled production, creative and marketing for the serial Rajni (1995–96); marketing for a Marathi serial Kondmara for DD Marathi (1996–97); and marketing and executive production for Kabhi Yeh Kabhi Woh, a sitcom for DD II.

He has also produced and marketed the Gujarati serials Miyan Fuski, a comedy serial based on characters created by Jivram Joshi; Parinam, a suspense thriller for DD Mumbai and Ahmedabad; and Aahwan, a family drama.

Modi founded the television production company Neela Tele Films Private Limited in 1995, starting with the show Hum Sab Ek Hain, followed by shows in other genres including comedy, drama, poetry series and reality game shows.

The Hindi sitcom Taarak Mehta Ka Ooltah Chashmah (SAB TV) is based on Gujarati humorist Taarak Mehta's weekly column "Duniya Ne Undha Chashma" published in the Gujarati magazine Chitralekha. Modi modified the show's story for a present-day audience.

Filmography

Awards and recognition 
5th National Conference organized by the HR Club
Indian Television Academy Awards
Indian Telly Awards
 Lion's Gold Award by Lion's Club Mumbai

References 

1966 births
Living people
Indian television producers